Attalia is an extinct town in Walla Walla County, Washington. The GNIS classifies it as a populated place. Attalia was located on the East shore of the Columbia River some 8 miles downriver from Burbank.

A post office called Attalia was established in 1906, and remained in operation until 1952. According to tradition, the town was named after a place in Italy.

Attalia was a stop on both the Northern Pacific Railway and the Oregon Railroad and Navigation Company in 1909.  During the 1920s, the town had a newspaper, the News Tribune.  Some amount of oil exploration also took place during the 1920s, but never amounted to anything.

References

Ghost towns in Washington (state)
Populated places in Walla Walla County, Washington